"You're Still New to Me" is a song written by Paul Davis and Paul Overstreet, and recorded by American country music artist Marie Osmond as a duet with Davis.  It was released in July 1986 as the first single from Osmond's album I Only Wanted You.  The song was the only collaboration as a duo for Osmond and Davis (though Davis had written Osmond's other number-one duet, "Meet Me in Montana," for her and Dan Seals) and went to number one on the country chart.  The single was number one for one week and spent a total of thirteen weeks on the country chart. When performed live since Davis's death, Jay Osmond, Marie's brother, usually serves as her duet partner.

Charts

References

1986 singles
Male–female vocal duets
Marie Osmond songs
Paul Davis (singer) songs
Songs written by Paul Davis (singer)
Songs written by Paul Overstreet
Song recordings produced by Paul Worley
Capitol Records Nashville singles
Curb Records singles
1986 songs